The Shomron Regional Council (Mo'atza Azorit Shomron, English Samaria Regional Council) is an Israeli regional council in the northern portion of the Israeli-occupied West Bank. Thirty-five Israeli settlements fall under its jurisdiction. As of December 2020 the jurisdiction area of the council has a population of about 47,200 people. The main offices are located in the Barkan Industrial Park.

The international community considers Israeli settlements in the West Bank illegal under international law, but the Israeli government disputes this.

Covering 2,800 square kilometers of the West Bank, it was, prior to the fall of 2005 when some of its municipal land was abandoned as part of Israel's unilateral disengagement plan, the largest Israeli regional council in municipal area.

In August 2015, Yossi Dagan was elected to position of Chairman of Shomron Regional Council, with 62% of the vote.

Geography
The municipal area of the Council spreads across 2,800 square kilometers, which corresponds to about 10 percent of the area of the State of Israel within the Green Line. In municipal area, Shomron Regional Council is among the largest Israeli authorities.

The municipal boundaries:
North: the (former) settlements of Ganim and Kadim, reaching to Megiddo Junction.
West: the settlement of Tzofim, reaching to Kfar Saba.
South: the settlements of Peduel and Alei Zahav.
The Council is divided into geographic regions, where each region has its own characteristics:
The Northern Shomron region: Hinanit, Hermesh, Tal Menashe, Mevo Dotan, Reihan, Shaked. All the communities are secular, except for Tal Menashe. Population is around 2,000.
Central-Western Shomron: Avnei Hefetz, Barkan, Ma'ale Shomron, Nofim, Sal'it, Einav, Etz Efraim, Peduel, Tzufim, Kiryat Netafim, Revava, Shavei Shomron, Sha'arei Tikva, Yakir: mixed population (secular and religious). Most of the communities are large and well established. If you add to them the Local Authorities in Samaria (Alfei Menashe, Elkana, Immanuel, Karnei Shomron, Kedumim, Oranit; and the city of Ariel), all of which are located in this region, the Jewish population numbers about 60,000.
Mountain Communities: Elon Moreh, Itamar, Har Brakha, Yitzhar (one block, near Nablus, population about 3,000), and farther south, Kfar Tapuach, Rehelim, and Migdalim, with less than 1000 residents.

Tourism 
The local government and residents of Shomron opened the region to local and international tourism. Boutique wineries, organic farms, historical and biblical sites have developed into tourism attractions. The Jewish Shepherd at Kfar Tapuach, the Barkan Industrial park and hiking tails in the scenic natural reserve at attracting tourists from around the world. Israel's Minister of Tourism Yariv Lavin was quoted saying: "I strongly believe in the tourism potential of Samaria. I can tell you from personal experience that I visited Samaria many times, and it might very well be the most beautiful region in Israel".

Sister City
On September 12, 2016, the Town of Hempstead in New York signed a Declaration of Cooperation with the Shomron Regional Council in the Israeli-occupied West Bank, as part of an effort to counter the BDS movement. Council Chairman Yossi Dagan, Town Supervisor Anthony Santino, Councilmen Bruce Blakeman, Anthony D'Esposito, and Edward Ambrosino signed the document.

Towns of Shomron
The largest settlement in the Shomron Regional Council today is Sha'arei Tikva, numbering over 5,500 residents.

List of settlements

Alei Zahav
Avnei Hefetz
Beit El
Barkan
Bruchin
Einav
Elon Moreh
Etz Efraim
Har Bracha
Hermesh
Hinanit
Itamar
Kfar Tapuach
Kiryat Netafim
Ma'ale Shomron
Mevo Dotan
Migdalim
Nofim
Peduel
Rehelim
Reihan
Revava
Sal'it
Sha'arei Tikva
Shaked
Shavei Shomron
Tel Menashe
Tzofim
Yakir
Yitzhar

Razed settlements
During the implementation of Israel's unilateral disengagement plan of August/September 2005, the residents of four of the Shomron Regional Council's settlements were evicted, their residential buildings destroyed, and land abandoned to the Palestinians, including territory outlined in the Oslo Accords as Area 'C' in full Israeli control.

In northern Shomron:

Ganim
Homesh
Kadim
Sa-Nur

References

External links
Shomron Regional Council website

 
Israeli regional councils in the West Bank